"Killer" is a song by American rapper Eminem from the deluxe edition of his eleventh studio album Music to Be Murdered By. The song was released as the album's thirteenth track on December 18, 2020 via Shady Records along with the rest of Music to Be Murdered By – Side B.

On May 27, 2021, Eminem released a tweet revealing that the remix would be released, stating "You know we had to do a remix, right?", while previewing a snippet of the song. The remix was released the following day, featuring fellow American rappers Jack Harlow and Cordae, marking the first collaboration between the three rappers.

Personnel
Credits adapted from Tidal
Marshall Mathers – main artist, vocals, songwriter
Jackman Harlow – featured artist, vocals, songwriter
Cordae Dunston – featured artist, vocals, songwriter
David Doman - producer
Ezemdi Chikwu - composer, songwriter
Luis Resto – keyboards, additional performer
Mike Strange – mixer, recording engineer, studio personnel
Joe Strange – recording engineer, studio personnel
Nickie Jon Pabon – vocal engineer, vocal mix

Charts

References

2020 songs
2021 singles
Aftermath Entertainment singles
Eminem songs
Interscope Records singles
Shady Records singles
Songs written by Eminem
Songs written by D.A. Got That Dope
Jack Harlow songs